The Cartographer is the second extended play by the Long Island indie rock band The Republic of Wolves. It was self-released digitally by the band on January 1, 2011. The EP was recorded, mixed, and mastered by guitarist/vocalist Gregg Andrew DellaRocca at his home studio and produced by the band members themselves. The EP is notable as it is the first release from the band where DellaRocca handles a majority of the lead vocals. The album was released on vinyl by Simple Stereo on May 6, 2011.

Track listing
All songs written by Gregg Andrew DellaRocca, Billy Duprey, Mason Maggio, Christian Van Deurs, and Chris Wall.

References

External links
The Republic of Wolves on iTunes
The Republic of Wolves - The Cartographer on Simple Stereo

2011 EPs
The Republic of Wolves albums
Self-released albums